Boolcoomatta Reserve is a 630 km2  private protected area  in eastern South Australia, 463 km north-east of Adelaide and 100 km west of Broken Hill.  It is owned and managed by Bush Heritage Australia (BHA).

History
The land was used as a sheep station for 150 years, running a flock as large as 90,000 sheep.  There are also relics of some small-scale  copper mining on the property.

The land was purchased by BHA in 2006 with assistance from the Australian Government and Nature Foundation SA.

Landscape and vegetation
Much of Boolcoomatta is flat, with undulating ranges and rocky outcrops in the western section of the property.  The ranges support open Acacia woodland while the plains to the east support shrublands of chenopods, including saltbush, as well as tussock grassland.  Usually dry creeks, with occasional waterholes, are lined with river red gums.  The climate is arid, with an average annual rainfall of 190 mm.

Fauna
A survey of the Boolcoomatta Reserve's wildlife conducted in 2012 by a team of 50 volunteers found healthy bird populations and increasing numbers of marsupials and reptiles.  Other threatened animal species present on the reserve include the slender-billed thornbill and thick-billed grasswren.  There is habitat suitable for the yellow-footed rock wallaby, which is present on adjoining Bimbowrie Conservation Park.

The reserve is overlapped by part of the Boolcoomatta, Bindarrah and Kalkaroo Stations Important Bird Area which has been identified by BirdLife International as supporting a significant population of plains-wanderers.

Protected area status
Boolcoomatta Reserve has protected area status within the Australian National Reserve System due to the property being subject to a conservation covenant where BHA has agreed to it being "reserved in perpetuity".  The reserve is classified as an IUCN Category II protected area.

See also
 Protected areas of South Australia

References

External links
 Boolcoomatta Reserve webpage
 Entry for Boolcoomatta Reserve on protected planet

Bush Heritage Australia reserves
Private protected areas of South Australia
Far North (South Australia)
2006 establishments in Australia
Protected areas established in 2006